Bad to the Bone is a 2010 novel by Jeri Smith-Ready. It is an espionage-farce sequel to 2008's Wicked Game. The book received a starred review from Publishers Weekly.

References

2010 American novels
American spy novels
American vampire novels
Urban fantasy novels
Gallery Books books